Andreas Sotiriou (born June 7, 1968) is a former international Cypriot football striker.

He started his career in 1987 from APOEL and he spent his career mainly there, where he totally played for twelve years. He had also played for Anorthosis Famagusta and Digenis Morphou.

External links
 

1968 births
Living people
APOEL FC players
Digenis Akritas Morphou FC players
Anorthosis Famagusta F.C. players
Cypriot footballers
Cyprus international footballers
Greek Cypriot people
Association football forwards